Days payable outstanding (DPO) is an efficiency ratio that measures the average number of days a company takes to pay its suppliers.

The formula for DPO is:

where ending A/P is the accounts payable balance at the end of the accounting period being considered and Purchase/day is calculated by dividing the total cost of goods sold per year by 365 days.

DPO provides one measure of how long a business holds onto its cash.

DPO can also be used to compare one company's payment policies to another.  Having fewer days of payables on the books than your competitors means they are getting better credit terms from their vendors than you are from yours. If a company is selling something to a customer, they can use that customer's DPO to judge when the customer will pay (and thus what payment terms to offer or expect).

Having a greater days payables outstanding may indicate the Company's ability to delay payment and conserve cash.  This could arise from better terms with vendors.

DPO is also a critical part of the "Cash Cycle", which measures DPO and the related Days Sales Outstanding and Days In Inventory.  When combined these three measurements tell us how long (in days) between a cash payment to a vendor into a cash receipt from a customer. This is useful because it indicates how much cash a business must have to sustain itself.

See also 
 Working capital analysis
 Days Sales Outstanding
 Days In Inventory
 Cash Conversion Cycle

Notes

External links 
 Basic Instruments of Working Capital Management

Financial ratios
Working capital management
Accounts payable